Trebečaj is a village in the municipality of Trnovo, Bosnia and Herzegovina.

Demographics 
According to the 2013 census, its population was 76, all Bosniaks.

References

Populated places in Trnovo, Sarajevo